David LaGrand (born August 13, 1966) is an American politician who is currently serving his last term in the Michigan House of Representatives from the 75th district, which he was elected to in 2016. In 2022, he ran for election to the Michigan Senate in the 30th district, losing to incumbent Mark Huizenga. He resides in Grand Rapids, Michigan with his wife, Melissa LaGrand, and four children: John, Issac, Helen, and Julia.

Early life and education 
LaGrand is a graduate of the local Calvin College (now Calvin University) (1988) and the University of Chicago Law School (1992).

Career 
After graduating, David returned to Grand Rapids in 1994 and worked at local law firm Warner Norcross & Judd while founding a local coffee shop. He then served 8 years as an Assistant County Prosecutor in Kent County, Michigan, before forming private law firms Lykins & LaGrand PLC, and later Yates, LaGrand and Denenfeld PLLC. During this time, he founded another restaurant, Wealthy Street Bakery. He was then elected to the Grand Rapids City Commission, where he and partners started Long Road Distillers. In 2015, he ran and won election to the Michigan House of Representatives, where he currently serves.

References

1966 births
Living people
Democratic Party members of the Michigan House of Representatives
People from Grand Rapids, Michigan
21st-century American politicians
Michigan lawyers
American prosecutors